Rafael Núñez International Airport  is an international airport serving the Caribbean port city of Cartagena, Colombia. It is the largest airport in the country's northern Caribbean region in terms of passenger movement. It is located between the Caribbean coast and the Ciénaga de la Virgen marsh, in the center of Crespo, a neighborhood in northern Cartagena. It is named after Cartagena native Rafael Núñez, the former Colombian president who wrote the verses to the National Anthem of Colombia.

Airlines including Air Panama, Air Transat, American Airlines, Avianca, Copa Airlines, EasyFly, JetBlue, LATAM Colombia, LATAM Perú, Spirit Airlines, and Wingo have or had international flights from this airport to various cities in North, Central and South America. KLM has flights to Amsterdam, Netherlands, by way of Bogota (the airline does not own rights to transport passengers solely between Cartagena and Bogota).

History

The first aerial activity began in late 1919 when businessmen Nemesio de la Espriella of Cartagena and Guillermo Echavarria of Antioquía  began negotiations to acquire a Farman F-40 aircraft made in France. The aircraft arrived by ship disassembled and packed in boxes. They soon began building a makeshift hangar at Bocagrande, which was then an area of mangroves and a few vacation houses. A few years later they built a stunning Caribbean hotel. This was the beginning of the "Colombian Air Navigation Company".

The first flight took place on February 14, 1920, when pilot Jourdanet Jacques René Bazin flew the plane "Cartagena" around the city, carrying as passengers Guillermo Echavarria Martinez Martelo Tulita and the Queen of Carnival. Eight days later, a mail flight was made to the city of Barranquilla, marking the beginning of commercial aviation activity in the country.

In 1930, the SCADTA built another airfield on the island of Manzanillo. By 1940, the company had become Avianca and continued operating from Manzanillo to various domestic destinations.

It was in mid-1946 when TACA de Colombia established a subsidiary called Colombian Aerodromes Company (ECA), dedicated to the construction and maintenance of airfields, to provide technical maintenance for aircraft company property, and to compete with Avianca. Until the mid-fifties, when airports were acquired by the State, Avianca never authorized the use of its airports by other airlines, and each business had to build its own facilities in the cities where it intended to operate.

In December 1946, Crespo Air Field was inaugurated with great pomp in Cartagena, which had been built by that subsidiary airport. Plans for the TACA de Colombia was to make the new aerodrome in the distribution center operations TACA group companies and eventually operate international flights to Panama, Costa Rica, Venezuela, and the United States, without interfering with operations Avianca and Pan American from the airport in Barranquilla, Soledad, and offering a healthy competition. With the suspension of operations of the company TACA de Colombia in April 1947, these plans were cut short. Crespo airport passed to LANSA company, already operating at the terminal since November 1946. LANSA airfield became famous during the festivities Crespo when novembrinas and the National Queen of Beauty, received the famous "real flights" to carry the candidates and their retinues, which were covered by major media in the country.

In 1979, Cartagena had 99 flights a week, 55 of which were shared flights; domestic and international flights were only 44 for the city. This flow was insufficient to meet the needs of the new hotel offering 7000 beds. In 1980, he organized the First Symposium for the Development of the City and the concerns raised and managed the tasks for the national government to end the redevelopment of the airport. And for 1982 was opened the new passenger terminal and extended runway to 2,600 feet, with resurfacing and navigational aids valued at $1.4 million. They built a berm of 15 feet, as well as a neighboring gutter to the runway and extended the platform. In addition, a waiting bay was built at the head of the track 3-6 for three aircraft, enabling the facilitation of air operations. It was concluded the perimeter wall and Juan Cano Angola and built houses for the monitoring of the safety zone. At the end of the year before had given the new parking service for 250 private cars, 14 positions for tour buses 120 and an additional area for taxis and the access roads to the city. With the new facilities are expected to contribute to the growth of tourism in the city, while private investment was devoted to the recovery of the walled city with its old houses, real colonial relics.

During 1993 and 1994, in developing the principles established in the new Constitution of 1991 to improve governance, the Law 105 of 1993 and the national government of President César Gaviria, by Decree 1647 of 994, arranged decentralization of airports by the Civil Aeronautics and set the parameters for this process forward. The aim was, therefore, to improve the technical capacity of Civil Aviation to carry out the functions of operation, control, service development and maintenance of the system of air traffic control, monitoring of air operations, technical control, moving territorial entities and public companies, private or mixed economic management and operation of airports. The Civil Aviation together with the consulting firm Booz Allen & Hamilton, the outline design of decentralization and concession contracts.

As a result of the study, the COMP (Committee for Economic and Social Policy), Ministry of Finance instructed the Civil Aeronautics initiation of processes for delivery through concession contracts busiest airports in the country El Dorado International Airport in Bogota, Alfonso Bonilla Aragon International Airport in Cali, Ernesto Cortissoz International Airport in Barranquilla and finally Rafael Nuñez Airport in Cartagena. After the failed bidding process for the Cali airport, it was restarted with Rafael Nunez airport tender on November 14, 1995. Closed on February 26, 1996, with the award of a contract to the Society Caribbean Airports S.A. (SACSA), which had as its operating partner at Schiphol Airport in the Netherlands. The transfer from the airport to the private operator took effect on September 25, 1996, for a period of 15 years. The first two years were quite complicated; it was the first case of transfer from one airport to private hands. The flow of passengers and number of operations did not coincide with the projections, to the detriment of the economic balance of the contract and SACSA signature was on the verge of bankruptcy. There need to renegotiate the terms of the contract by the Civil Aeronautics to save the grant. In this process is compounded by the sudden death of the Concession Manager, Eric Okker and replacement of the operator partners. Schiphol withdrew from the project and assumed the role of operating partner, the Spanish company AENA, which during this period had also made the concession of the airport in Barranquilla Ernesto Cortissoz. SACSA Since then the company has handled the airport to make the investments necessary under the Master Plan for airport development, improving air and for the construction of seven bridges of collision, extension, and maintenance of the platform of the main runway and taxiways.

Today, the Rafael Nunez International Airport is the fourth largest airport in the country, and one of the largest in the Caribbean region.

Airlines and destinations

Passenger

The following airlines operate regular scheduled and charter flights at the airport. Due to the COVID-19 pandemic, several regular scheduled flights are currently suspended.

Cargo

Note:

Statistics

Capacity and structure 

The airport is connected with 3 bays accessible from the runway, the aircraft taxi down the runway 1000 meters to stop turning over 300 meters and take-off position. The track is 60 meters wide and 2,600 m long at 0 meters above sea level provides sufficient capacity for modern transatlantic aircraft operations without problems. 
The airport has the capacity to house 11 aircraft and open skies for charter operations. 
Currently, SACSA S.A. has the contract to administer the airport

See also
Transport in Colombia
List of airports in Colombia

Accidents and incidents
On January 11, 1995, Intercontinental de Aviación Flight 256 crashed on approach to the airport due to instrument failures and pilot errors leading to a CFIT.

References

External links

Cartagena Airport at OurAirports

Airports in Colombia
Buildings and structures in Cartagena, Colombia
1946 establishments in Colombia
Airports established in 1946